Splendrillia aomoriensis is a species of sea snail, a marine gastropod mollusk in the family Drilliidae.

Description
The shell grows to a length of 8 mm.

Distribution
This species occurs in the demersal zone of the Pacific Ocean off Japan and the Philippines.

References

  Tucker, J.K. 2004 Catalog of recent and fossil turrids (Mollusca: Gastropoda). Zootaxa 682:1–1295.

External links
 

aomoriensis
Gastropods described in 1940